The Schuetz Log Cabin, near Dalton, Nebraska, is a historic log cabin that was listed on the National Register of Historic Places in 2011.

It was built sometime between 1900 and 1920 and was deemed significant in the local area "for architecture as an excellent example of log construction in Morrill County, Nebraska."  As of its NRHP nomination date in 2011, the cabin was in "fair" condition and "its core character defining features" were being revealed in rehabilitation in progress.

It was built on the homestead of Louie Schuetz, who claimed  of land under the Homestead Act in 1890, after finding the site while hunting. Its attraction was that it had water. After they married in 1891, they built and lived in, in succession, a sod house, then a native stone house, then the surviving log cabin, and later a frame house.

References

Houses on the National Register of Historic Places in Nebraska
Houses completed in 1920
Buildings and structures in Morrill County, Nebraska
Log cabins in the United States
National Register of Historic Places in Morrill County, Nebraska
Log buildings and structures on the National Register of Historic Places in Nebraska